James Henry Mullen (January 9, 1877 – December 6, 1956) was an American Major League Baseball infielder.

References

1877 births
1956 deaths
Major League Baseball infielders
Philadelphia Athletics players
Washington Senators (1901–1960) players
Baltimore Orioles (IL) players
Newark Sailors players
Newark Indians players
Toronto Maple Leafs (International League) players
Utica Utes players
Memphis Chickasaws players
Scranton Miners players
Plattsburgh (baseball) players
Manhattan Jaspers baseball players
Baseball players from Pennsylvania
Cynthiana Cobblers players